The Blackwater River is a  river in the Allegheny Mountains of eastern West Virginia, USA. Via the Black Fork, it is a principal tributary of the Cheat River. It is a true blackwater stream, owing to spruce and hemlock trees in its watershed, the tannins of which impart a tea or amber color to its water.

Geography
The entire course and drainage area of the Blackwater lie within Tucker County. Below the mouth of the latter, the Blackwater turns west-southwestwardly for the remainder of its course.

After passing the town of Davis, it falls  over Blackwater Falls and enters the eight-mile (13 km) long Blackwater Canyon in Blackwater Falls State Park. Here it forms whitewater rapids of Class IV-V+ and collects the eight-mile (13 km) long North Fork Blackwater River, which flows past the town of Thomas.

Water quality

Blackwater
As with other blackwater rivers, the color of West Virginia's Blackwater River results from the leaching of tannins from the decaying leaves of vegetation adjoining the stream in its upper reaches, which are slow moving. Fallen needles from stands of eastern hemlock and red spruce contribute primarily to this, although rhododendron, mountain laurel and the sphagnum bogs of Canaan Valley also contribute. The Blackwater is also typical in having transparent, acidic, and oligotrophic (very low nutrient) water.

Acid mine drainage
Beginning in the 1880s, the Blackwater River watershed (especially the segment of the North Fork of the Blackwater River between the towns of Thomas and Douglas) suffered extreme environmental degradation due to deep mining and coke production. This was exacerbated by the surface mining activities of the 1960s and '70s, which brought about a severe decline in water quality due to acid mine drainage (AMD).

In recent years, the limestone treatment of AMD in the Blackwater River has met with success with the effort receiving an award from the U.S. Office of Surface Mining. AMD is created when sulfite-bearing mineral strata are exposed to air and rainwater, such as when surface mining occurs. The sulfuric acid produced from the sulfite reaction can dissolve metals such as iron, aluminum, and magnesium.

Restoration of the Blackwater River watershed was a costly and complex task involving two large projects. The Douglas Highwall Abandoned Mine Land Reclamation Project installed 16,000 tons (14,400 tonnes) of limestone in a "Wetland/Anoxic Limestone Drain (WALD) system" on the North Fork Blackwater River downstream of Thomas. Although the experimental WALD system did not perform as intended, and "has not generated measurable alkalinity" it did reduce the total acid and metal load in the water discharge from the abandoned mine into the river system.

More successful was a project just upstream of Davis, on Beaver Creek, a tributary of the Blackwater. A six-drum water-powered limestone grinding station adds limestone slurry to the water flowing down Beaver Creek. A Swedish-designed limestone powder dosing system was also installed as backup to the drum system.  The  stretch of the Blackwater between the limestone station and the confluence with the North Fork has now become one of West Virginia's premiere catch and release trout streams.

Gallery

River water level
Two real time water gauges are available from the United States Geological Survey:
Blackwater River real time water gauge, 2.8 miles northeast of Davis, West Virginia
Blackwater River real time water gauge, 0.4 miles southwest of Davis, West Virginia

See also
List of rivers of West Virginia

References

External links
Blackwater Falls State Park
Canaan Valley Resort State Park
Canaan Valley National Wildlife Refuge

Rivers of West Virginia
Monongahela National Forest
Rivers of Tucker County, West Virginia
Natural history of West Virginia
Wild and Scenic Rivers of the United States